Sulakshana Khatri is an Indian actress who mainly works in television serials.

Filmography

Films
 Abu Kala (1990)
 Meera Dataar (1999)
 Angaar: The Fire (2002)
 Krishna Aur Kans (2012) as Putna (voice role)

Television

References

External links
 
 

Living people
Indian film actresses
Indian television actresses
Indian soap opera actresses
Actresses in Gujarati cinema
Actresses in Hindi cinema
Actresses in Hindi television
20th-century Indian actresses
21st-century Indian actresses
Year of birth missing (living people)